Douglas Johnstone (born 12 March 1969 in Irvine, North Ayrshire) is a Scottish footballer. He played professionally as a central defender before retiring and becoming a teacher at various schools around North Ayrshire, including the now demolished St Matthews Academy in Saltcoats. He teaches Mathematics up to an Advanced Higher level and is qualified to teach Computing.

He most famously played for Greenock Morton, before joining the later-to-become Morton players Kevin Finlayson, Allan Jenkins and failed trialist Derek Wingate at Stranraer.

References

1969 births
Living people
Scottish footballers
Footballers from Irvine, North Ayrshire
Greenock Morton F.C. players
Stranraer F.C. players
Scottish Football League players
Association football defenders
Scottish Junior Football Association players
Glenafton Athletic F.C. players